Highway 768 is a provincial highway in the Canadian province of Saskatchewan. It runs from Highway 7 near Harris to Highway 4. Highway 768 is about 35 km (22 mi.) long.

Highway 768 passes through Valley Centre. The only highway it intersects is Highway 655.

See also 
Roads in Saskatchewan
Transportation in Saskatchewan

References 

768